Léon Broers (born 14 April 1905, date of death unknown) was a Belgian long-distance runner. He competed in the marathon at the 1928 Summer Olympics.

References

External links
 

1905 births
Year of death missing
Athletes (track and field) at the 1928 Summer Olympics
Belgian male long-distance runners
Belgian male marathon runners
Olympic athletes of Belgium
Place of birth missing